Placerita Canyon State Park is a California State Park located on the north slope of the western San Gabriel Mountains, in an unincorporated rural area of Los Angeles County, near the city of Santa Clarita. The park hosts a variety of historic and natural sites, as well as serving as a trailhead for several hiking trails leading into the San Gabriel Mountains.

Cultural history

The area of Placerita Canyon, in addition to the Santa Clarita Valley and the surrounding mountains, have been inhabited by the native Tataviam since time immemorial.

In 1842, the region was annexed under Rancho San Francisco, part of the larger Mexican land grant system that was dissolved 8 years later with California statehood inside the United States. The park preserves the site of the first documented discovery of gold in California where in 1842, Francisco Lopez found gold flakes on wild onion roots under the "Oak of the Golden Dream".

In 1900, oil was discovered within the valley.

The park is near several movie ranches, all historic and active, including the Monogram Movie Ranch—Melody Ranch and the Disney—Golden Oak Ranch.

The "Oak of the Golden Dream" is California Historical Landmark #168.

Geography
Placerita Canyon State Park is located along Placerita Creek in the southeastern Santa Clarita Valley, just outside the city limits of Santa Clarita but within its sphere of influence. It lies between the Santa Clarita neighborhoods of Newhall and Sand Canyon.

The park, under the name Placerita Canyon Natural Area, is currently managed by the Los Angeles County Department of Parks and Recreation. The Placerita Canyon Nature Center is the park's visitor center and museum. The park also contains the Walker Cabin (a restored and furnished 1920s cabin of the Walker family), and hiking and nature trails.

Geology
The park is also notable for a seepage of 'white' oil - unknown anywhere else in the world.  This late 19th century discovery of oil surprised the prospectors because it is naturally filtered so that it is not black but transparent.  A small pool of it continues to be active by the trailside leading up from the Nature Center to the Walker Ranch.

Ecology
Located in the transition zone between the San Gabriel Mountains' California montane chaparral and woodlands ecoregion, and the Mojave's Deserts and xeric shrublands Biome in the California Floristic Province, the Placerita Canyon Flora is complex. Placerita Canyon State Park is in the east-west trending Placerita Canyon on the Placerita Fault and contains sandstone and metamorphic formations, and seasonal streams. Chaparral and Coast Live Oak woodland plant communities are represented.

Riparian woodlands at the park include three species of native trees including arroyo willow, cottonwood, and native California sycamore.

Gallery

See also
Rancho San Francisco
Disney—Golden Oak Ranch
Monogram Movie Ranch/Melody Ranch
California Floristic Province
Native American history of California

References

External links

Placerita Canyon State Park website
Los Angeles County Parks and Recreation: Placerita Canyon Natural Area website
Placerita Canyon Nature Center Associates website
Placerita Canyon Flora (Plants List)
California's REAL First Gold
Santa Clarita Valley Historical Society website
 Melody Ranch Studio Museum
City of Santa Clarita Cowboy Poetry & Music Festival

1950 establishments in California
California Gold Rush
Geography of Los Angeles County, California
History of Los Angeles County, California
Mexican California
Nature centers in California
Parks in Los Angeles County, California
Santa Clarita, California
Protected areas established in 1950
San Gabriel Mountains
State parks of California